The German navies—specifically the  and  of Imperial and Nazi Germany, respectively—built a series of battleships between the 1890s and 1940s. To defend its North and Baltic Sea coasts in wartime, Germany had previously built a series of smaller ironclad warships, including coastal defense ships, and armored frigates. With the accession to the throne of Kaiser Wilhelm II in 1888, the Kaiserliche Marine began a program of naval expansion befitting a Great Power. The navy immediately pushed for the construction of the four s, after which soon followed five  ships. The appointment of Admiral Alfred von Tirpitz to the post of State Secretary of the Navy in 1897 accelerated naval construction. Tirpitz's "risk theory" planned a fleet that would be sufficiently powerful so that Great Britain, then the world's preeminent naval power, would avoid risking war with Germany in order to preserve its superiority.

Tirpitz secured a series of Naval Laws between 1900 and 1912 that drastically increased the budget of the navy and authorized scores of battleships; the final law envisioned a fleet of some 41 battleships, 25 of which would have been assigned to the High Seas Fleet, with the remainder in reserve. The launch of the "all-big-gun"  in 1906 revolutionized battleship construction, and forced Tirpitz to radically alter his shipbuilding plan. The four s followed in 1908, as well as the five s in 1909–1910. Four s were laid down in 1911–1912, and four s were laid down in 1913–1915, though only two— and —were completed. Germany's defeat in 1918 resulted in the internment of the majority of the High Seas Fleet at Scapa Flow; the ships were eventually scuttled on 21 June 1919 to prevent them from being seized by the British Royal Navy. Of the ten battleships interned, only one, Baden, was prevented from sinking; she was later expended as a gunnery target by the Royal Navy.

Following the war, Germany was limited to eight pre-dreadnought battleships, two of which would be in reserve. New warships were severely limited in terms of armament and size. Admiral Erich Raeder was appointed the commander of the German navy in 1928. Raeder initially employed a cautious strategy vis a vis the government of the Weimar Republic. However, the rise of Adolf Hitler and the Nazi Party in 1933 allowed Raeder opportunity to expand the fleet. Hitler's government negotiated the Anglo-German Naval Agreement in 1935, which stipulated the German navy could rebuild to 35 percent of the strength of the Royal Navy. Plan Z was formulated in 1939 to rebuild the German navy; the plan called for six additional battleships of the H-39 class. Two of them were laid down in mid-1939, though they were canceled within two months, due to the outbreak of World War II in September 1939. The other four were canceled without any work being done. Bismarck, Tirpitz, and Scharnhorst were sunk during the war and Gneisenau was scuttled in Gotenhafen in 1945. Further design studies were drawn up, culminating in the massive H-44 class, but they were not serious proposals due to the infeasibility and expense of the ships.



Pre-dreadnought battleships

Brandenburg class

The Brandenburg-class ships were the first ocean-going battleships built for the German navy, and marked the beginning of German naval expansion. Previous classes included several types of ironclad ships, including coastal defense ships and armored frigates. The ships were unique for the time in that they were armed with six large-caliber guns instead of four, as was standard on contemporary ships in other navies. The class comprised four ships: Brandenburg, Kurfürst Friedrich Wilhelm, Weissenburg, and Wörth. Of the four ships, Kurfürst Friedrich Wilhelm and Weissenburg were more advanced, in that their armor was composed of higher quality steel.

The four ships were commissioned into the I Battle Squadron. They saw overseas service during the Boxer Uprising in China in 1900–1901 under the command of Marshal Alfred von Waldersee. Following the return from China, the Brandenburgs were taken into drydock for modernization, which lasted from 1901 to 1905 depending on the ship. During the reconstruction the superstructure was cut down, a second conning tower was added, and the steam boilers were replaced with newer models. Kurfürst Friedrich Wilhelm and Weissenburg were sold to the Ottoman Empire in 1910 and renamed Barbaros Hayreddin and Turgut Reis, respectively. Brandenburg and Wörth were decommissioned and placed into reserve. At the start of World War I, both ships were recalled to active service as coastal defense ships, but due to their age they were quickly demobilized. They spent the remainder of the war as barracks ships before being broken up in 1920.

Kaiser Friedrich III class

The five Kaiser Friedrich III-class ships set the standard for later German pre-dreadnought battleships: they carried smaller main guns than their foreign contemporaries, but a heavier secondary battery. This was in accordance with the "hail of fire" theory, which emphasized smaller, rapid firing guns over larger and slower guns. The ships of the class were also the first German battleships to use three screws, which would be used in many subsequent ships, as opposed to two in the Brandenburgs. The class was composed of five ships: Kaiser Friedrich III, Kaiser Wilhelm II, Kaiser Wilhelm der Grosse, Kaiser Karl der Grosse, and Kaiser Barbarossa. All of the ships were named for German emperors.

Upon commissioning, the five ships were assigned to the I Squadron of the Home Fleet (Heimatflotte). Kaiser Wilhelm II saw service as the fleet flagship until 1906. After ten years of fleet service, they were replaced with newer ships. They were transferred to the III Squadron of the fleet, which had by then been reorganized as the High Seas Fleet, and placed in reserve. In 1907, all five ships were taken into drydock for significant rebuilding. The funnels were made taller, the superstructure was cut down, and the secondary guns were rearranged; work lasted until 1910. The five ships saw no front-line service during World War I; they were all disarmed and relegated to secondary duties. Kaiser Wilhelm der Grosse was used as a torpedo training ship, Kaiser Wilhelm II was used as a headquarters ship, while the other three became prison ships. They were all broken up between 1919 and 1922.

Wittelsbach class

The Wittelsbach class represented an incremental improvement over the preceding Kaiser Friedrich III class. They were equipped with the same armament of four 24 cm guns, but were given an additional torpedo tube. They had improved defensive capabilities, as they were protected by a more extensive armored belt. They also differed from the preceding ships in their main deck, the entire length of which was flush. The Kaiser Friedrich III had a cut-down quarterdeck. The ships of the class, which included Wittelsbach, Wettin, Zähringen, Schwaben, and Mecklenburg, were the first battleships built under the first Naval Law of 1898.

After joining the fleet, the Wittelsbach class ships were assigned to the I Battle Squadron, where they replaced the older Brandenburg-class ships. Like the Kaiser Friedrich III-class ships, the Wittelsbachs were withdrawn from active service after the advent of the dreadnoughts. The five ships were recalled to active service at the outbreak of war in 1914. They were assigned to the IV Battle Squadron and deployed to the Baltic. However, due to their age and vulnerability, they were withdrawn from active service by 1916. They were used as training ships, with the exception of Mecklenburg, which was used as a prison ship. In 1919, Wittelsbach and Schwaben were converted into depot ships for minesweepers. By 1922, all of the ships had been broken up for scrap, with the exception of Zähringen. She was converted into a radio-controlled target ship in 1926–1927. RAF bombers sank the ship in Gotenhafen in 1944; the wreck was broken up in 1949–1950.

Braunschweig class

The Braunschweig class, which consisted of Braunschweig, Elsass, Hessen, Preussen, and Lothringen, was a considerable improvement over the preceding types of battleships in the German navy. They were equipped with much more powerful 28 cm guns for their main battery, although this was still smaller than the standard  guns used on British ships. The main battery turrets were mounted on the forecastle deck, as opposed to one deck higher as in the older ships. They were also larger and faster than their predecessors, though armor protection was largely the same. These ships were authorized under the Naval Law of 1900.

In 1907 the II Battle Squadron was organized; the five Braunschweig-class battleships were assigned to it, along with the five new Deutschland-class ships. When war broke out in 1914, four of the Braunschweig-class ships were assigned to the IV Squadron alongside the Wittelsbach-class ships. Braunschweig and Elsass took part in the Battle of the Gulf of Riga in 1915. Hessen remained in the II Battle Squadron and saw action at the Battle of Jutland in 1916. After the war, Lothringen and Preussen were converted into depot ships for minesweepers. They were eventually scrapped in 1931. The hulk was raised and broken up in 1954. The other three ships were used as coastal defense ships, though between 1931 and 1935, they too were withdrawn from service and broken up, with the exception of Hessen. Hessen was converted into a radio-controlled target ship in 1935 and served in that capacity until the end of World War II in 1945. She was then ceded to the Soviet Navy and renamed Tsel.

Deutschland class

The five Deutschland-class battleships—Deutschland, Hannover, Pommern, Schlesien, and Schleswig-Holstein—were the last pre-dreadnoughts built by the German navy. They were similar to the Braunschweig-class ships, though their armor was thicker. The ships were built despite rumors of the capabilities of the revolutionary . Admiral von Tirpitz insisted on their construction as larger ships would have necessitated widening the Kaiser Wilhelm Canal; this would have put an enormous strain on the naval budget for the year.

Following their commissioning starting in 1906, they were assigned to the new II Battle Squadron; Deutschland replaced Kaiser Wilhelm II as the fleet flagship. During World War I, the ships remained in the II Battle Squadron and saw combat at the Battle of Jutland in 1916. Their slow speed hindered the more modern dreadnoughts of the High Seas Fleet. Early on the second day of the battle, Pommern was sunk by a single torpedo that triggered an ammunition magazine explosion. Following the battle the Deutschlands were withdrawn from fleet duty and ultimately out of service completely in August 1917. Deutschland was broken up in 1920. The three remaining ships saw continued service in the German navy; Hannover was struck in 1935 and eventually broken up in 1944–1946. Schlesien and Schleswig-Holstein were both sunk during World War II but later raised. Schlesien was broken up in 1949–1970, while Schleswig-Holstein was transferred to the Soviet Navy in 1946.

Dreadnought battleships

Nassau class

The Nassau class, which was composed of Nassau, Westfalen, Rheinland, and Posen, was the German response to the arrival of HMS Dreadnought, the first "all-big-gun" battleship, in 1906. The ships were unusual in their main-armament configuration, which was hexagonal. They retained triple-expansion engines instead of more powerful turbine engines, and as a result, were slower than their British contemporaries.

After their commissioning into the German fleet, all four ships served in the II Division of I Battle Squadron. Two of the ships, Nassau and Posen, took part in the inconclusive Battle of the Gulf of Riga in 1915, during which they engaged the Russian pre-dreadnought Slava. The four Nassau-class ships took part in the Battle of Jutland on 31 May and 1 June 1916; they suffered only a handful of secondary battery hits and limited casualties. In early 1918 Rheinland and Westfalen were sent to Finland to support the White Finns in their civil war, but Rheinland ran aground off Åland in April and was severely damaged. At the end of World War I, the four ships were seized as war prizes by the victorious Allied powers and sold for scrapping.

Helgoland class

The Helgoland class was the second type of German dreadnoughts, built during 1908–1912. The class was composed of four ships: Helgoland, Oldenburg, Ostfriesland, and Thüringen. The ships incorporated significant improvements over the previous Nassau type, including more powerful main guns and an improved propulsion system. The Helgolands were easily distinguished from the preceding Nassaus by the three funnels that were closely arranged, compared to the two larger funnels of the previous class. The ships retained the unusual hexagonal main battery layout of the Nassau class.

The ships served as a unit in the I Division, I Battle Squadron alongside the Nassau-class ships in the II Division of the I Battle Squadron. They saw combat during World War I, including the Battle of Jutland in the North Sea and the Battle of the Gulf of Riga in the Baltic. All four survived the war, but were not taken as part of the German fleet that was interned at Scapa Flow. After the German fleet at Scapa Flow were scuttled, the four Helgolands were ceded as war reparations to the victorious Allied powers in the sunken ships' stead. Ostfriesland was taken by the US Navy and expended as a target during Billy Mitchell's air power demonstration in July 1921. Helgoland and Oldenburg were allotted to Britain and Japan respectively, and broken up in 1921. Thüringen was delivered to France in 1920, and was used as a target ship for the French navy. The ship was eventually broken up between 1923 and 1933.

Kaiser class

As was usual for German battleships of the period, the Kaiser class mounted main guns that were smaller than those of their British rivals: , compared to the  guns of the British . The ten SK L/50 guns were mounted in five twin turrets; one turret was mounted fore, two aft in a superfiring arrangement, and the other two in a staggered "wing" arrangement amidships.

All five ships saw action in the North Sea during the war; they served together as the VI Division of the III Battle Squadron, with Friedrich der Grosse serving as the fleet flagship. Four were present during the Battle of Jutland; König Albert was in dock at the time. Of the four ships that took part in the battle, only Kaiser was damaged, being struck by two heavy-caliber shells. The ships also took part in Operation Albion in the Baltic Sea; during the operation they were reorganized as the IV Battle Squadron, under the command of Vice Admiral Wilhelm Souchon. At the end of the war, all five ships were interned at the British naval base at Scapa Flow. On 21 June 1919, they were scuttled to prevent their seizure by the Royal Navy. The ships were subsequently raised and broken up for scrap between 1929 and 1937.

König class

König, Grosser Kurfürst, Markgraf, and Kronprinz, the four ships of the König class, were the most powerful warships of the High Seas Fleet at the outbreak of war in 1914. The Königs were an improvement over the preceding ; one of the wing turrets was moved forward and placed in a superfiring arrangement, while the second wing turret was moved to the centerline amidships. This allowed for a wider angle of fire on the broadside, as all 10 guns could fire on a larger area compared to the earlier Kaisers.

The class operated as a unit throughout World War I—the V Division of the III Battle Squadron. The ships took part in a number of fleet operations during the war, including the Battle of Jutland, where they acted as the vanguard of the German line and were heavily engaged by the British fleet. The ships also took part in Operation Albion against the Russians in 1917, where König sank the battleship Slava. They survived the war and were interned at Scapa Flow in November 1918. All four ships were scuttled there on 21 June 1919.

Bayern class

The four Bayern-class ships were the first super-dreadnoughts built by the German navy. The class comprised Bayern, Baden, Sachsen, and Württemberg. Construction started on the ships shortly before World War I; Baden was laid down in 1913, Bayern and Sachsen followed in 1914, and Württemberg, the final ship, was laid down in 1915. Only Baden and Bayern were completed, as ship building priorities shifted as the war dragged on. It was determined that U-boats were more valuable to the war effort, and so work on new battleships was slowed and ultimately stopped altogether. As a result, Bayern and Baden were the last German battleships completed by the Kaiserliche Marine.

Bayern and Baden were commissioned into the fleet in July 1916 and March 1917, respectively. This was too late for either ship to take part in the Battle of Jutland on 31 May and 1 June 1916. Bayern was assigned to the naval force that drove the Imperial Russian Navy from the Gulf of Riga during Operation Albion in October 1917, though the ship was severely damaged from a mine and had to be withdrawn to Kiel for repairs. Baden replaced Friedrich der Grosse as the flagship of the High Seas Fleet, but saw no combat. Both vessels were interned at Scapa Flow following the Armistice in November 1918. Bayern was successfully scuttled on 21 July 1919, but British guards managed to beach Baden to prevent her from sinking. The ship was eventually expended as a gunnery target in 1921. Sachsen and Württemberg, both at various stages of completion when the war ended, were broken up for scrap metal in the early 1920s.

L 20e α class

The L 20e α design was a plan for an unknown number of battleships to be built in 1918 for the German navy. The design was selected on 2 October 1917, and construction was to have started 11 September 1918. The ships would have been significantly larger than the preceding Bayern class, at more than  longer than the preceding ships. The ships would have been the first German warship to have mounted guns larger than 16 in (40.6 cm cm). However, Germany's declining war situation meant that the ships were never built.

Scharnhorst class

The two Scharnhorst-class battleships were the first capital ships built for the Kriegsmarine after the end of World War I. They marked the beginning of German naval rearmament after the Treaty of Versailles. The class comprised two vessels: Scharnhorst and Gneisenau. The ships were armed with nine 28 cm (11 in) SK C/34 guns in three triple turrets, though there were plans to replace these weapons with six 38 cm (15 in) SK C/34 guns in twin turrets.

The two ships were laid down in 1935, launched in late 1936, and commissioned into the German fleet by early 1939. Scharnhorst and Gneisenau operated together for much of the early portion of World War II, including sorties into the Atlantic to raid British merchant shipping. The two ships participated in Operation Weserübung, the German invasion of Norway. During operations off Norway, the two ships engaged the battlecruiser  and sank the aircraft carrier — in the engagement with Glorious, Scharnhorst achieved one of the longest-range naval gunfire hits in history. In early 1942, the two ships made a daylight dash up the English Channel from occupied France to Germany.

In late 1942, Gneisenau was heavily damaged in an Allied air raid against Kiel. In early 1943, Scharnhorst joined the Bismarck-class battleship Tirpitz in Norway to interdict Allied convoys to the Soviet Union. Scharnhorst and several destroyers sortied from Norway to attack a convoy; the Germans were instead intercepted by British naval patrols. During the Battle of North Cape, the Royal Navy battleship  sank Scharnhorst. In the meantime, repair work on Gneisenau had begun, and the ship was in the process of being rearmed. However, when Scharnhorst was sunk, work on her sister was abandoned. Instead, she was sunk as a blockship in Gdynia in 1945; the wreck was broken up for scrap in the 1950s.

Bismarck class

Bismarck and Tirpitz were the last and largest battleships completed by the German navy, as well as the heaviest ever built in Europe. They were built according to the terms of the Anglo-German Naval Agreement signed in 1935, and ostensibly displaced no more than the  specified in the agreement. The ships were, in actuality, some  heavier at full load. The ships were built to counter new French battleships then under construction.

Both ships saw combat during World War II. Bismarck was deployed in May 1941 to raid British shipping in the Atlantic Ocean along with the heavy cruiser . During the operation, Bismarck sank the battlecruiser  and heavily damaged the new battleship  and forced her to retreat. All of the available British naval assets were mobilized in a massive hunt to track and destroy Bismarck.

Tirpitzs career was less active; she spent the majority of the war as a fleet in being in occupied Norway. The Royal Navy attempted to sink her with midget submarines, but these efforts were unsuccessful. In November 1944, RAF Lancaster bombers hit the ship three times with  bombs, which caused her to capsize and sink. The wreck was eventually broken up in 1948–1957.

H-class proposals

The H-class was a series of battleship designs to fulfill the requirements of Plan Z in the late 1930s and early 1940s. The first variation, "H-39," called for six ships to be built, essentially as enlarged s with  guns. The "H-41" design improved the "H-39" ship with still larger main guns, with eight  weapons. Two subsequent plans, "H-42" and "H-43", increased the main battery yet again, with  pieces, and the monstrous "H-44" design ultimately resulted with  guns. Due to the outbreak of war in 1939, none of the ships were ever built; only two of the "H-39" ships were laid down, and what work had been accomplished was scrapped shortly thereafter.

Footnotes

Notes

Citations

References

Further reading
 

 
Battleships
Germany